Thomas W. Wallis (4 July 1920 – 26 November 2001) was an Australian rules footballer who played with Collingwood in the Victorian Football League (VFL).

Wallis played with Collingwood during World War I, then went back to his original club Northcote as captain-coach in 1945. He opted to return to Collingwod in May, in time to play in round eight. At the end of the year he played in two finals and appeared in another three in 1946, but never made it to a grand final. He was a wingman and half back flanker.

Wallis later coached the Collingwood Under-19s side. His son, Gary Wallis, played for Collingwood and St Kilda.

References

1920 births
Australian rules footballers from Victoria (Australia)
Collingwood Football Club players
Northcote Football Club players
Northcote Football Club coaches
2001 deaths